Philotheca deserti is a species of flowering plant in the family Rutaceae and is endemic to inland Western Australia. It is an erect shrub with narrow spindle-shaped, glandular-warty leaves and white flowers arranged singly in leaf axils.

Description
The ten stamens each are free from each other.

Taxonomy and naming
This philotheca was first formally described in 1904 by Ernst Georg Pritzel who gave it the name Eriostemon desertii and published the description in Botanische Jahrbücher für Systematik, Pflanzengeschichte und Pflanzengeographie from specimens he collected near Southern Cross. In 1998, Paul Wilson changed the name to Philotheca deserti and described two subspecies in the journal Nuytsia.
 Philotheca deserti (E.Pritz.)

Distribution and habitat
Philotheca deserti grows on undulating plains and hills between Kalgoorlie, Menzies and Yalgoo in the Avon Wheatbelt, Coolgardie and Murchison biogeographic regions.

Conservation status
This species is classified as "not threatened" by the Western Australian Government Department of Parks and Wildlife, but subspecies brevifolia is listed as "Priority Three" by the Government of Western Australia Department of Parks and Wildlife meaning that it is poorly known and known from only a few locations but is not under imminent threat.

References

deserti
Flora of Western Australia
Sapindales of Australia
Plants described in 1904
Taxa named by Ernst Pritzel